Megan Nicole Kufeld (born March 25, 1993) is an American former soccer goalkeeper who played for Medkila IL of the Norwegian Toppserien. She previously represented Sundsvalls DFF of the Swedish Elitettan and Seattle Sounders Women in the United Soccer Leagues W-League.

Early life
Born in Fremont, California to Melinda and Bob Kufeld, Megan attended Washington High School where was her class valedictorian and received honors from her school's science department.

University of Washington Huskies, 2011–2015 
Kufeld attended the University of Washington where she majored in biology with a focus on molecular and cellular biology. She was named a UW President's Medalist for her academic achievement during her sophomore year. She committed to play for the Washington Huskies women's soccer team for 2011 and redshirted for the season.

During her senior season in 2015, she was twice-named Pac-12 Conference Goalkeeper of the Week. In September of the same year, she tied and later broke the school's shutout record previously held by Hope Solo.

Club career

Sundsvalls DFF, 2016–present 
In February 2016, Kufeld signed with Swedish club Sundsvalls DFF.

International career
Kufeld has represented the United States at the under-14, under-17, under-20 and under-23 levels.

Post-Soccer Life
After retiring from professional soccer, Kufeld entered the private sector as a Research Technician for Fred Hutch in Seattle, Washington. She currently works as a research associate at Seattle Genetics.

See also

References

External links 
 Washington player profile
 U.S. Soccer player profile
 Sounders Women player profile

Living people
American women's soccer players
Seattle Sounders Women players
Washington Huskies women's soccer players
USL W-League (1995–2015) players
1993 births
Soccer players from California
Women's association football goalkeepers
American expatriate sportspeople in Sweden
American expatriate women's soccer players
Expatriate women's footballers in Sweden
Medkila IL (women) players
Elitettan players
Sundsvalls DFF players